Indios Verdes commonly refers to Indios Verdes metro station, a station located in Gustavo A. Madero, northern Mexico City.

Indios Verdes may also refer to:
 Monumento a los Indios Verdes, two statues located in Gustavo A. Madero, northern Mexico City
 Cablebús Indios Verdes, an aerial lift station; opened in 2021
 Metrobús Indios Verdes (Line 1), a BRT station; opened in 2005
 Metrobús Indios Verdes (Line 3), a BRT station; in service since 2021
 Metrobús Indios Verdes (Line 7), a BRT station; opened in 2018
 Mexibús Indios Verdes, a BRT station; opened in 2021
 Mexicable Indios Verdes, an aerial lift station; to be opened in 2022